Neurozerra is a genus of moths in the family Cossidae. Three species of Neurozerra have been identified within the Cossidae, which comprises mostly large moths.

Species
 Neurozerra conferta (Walker, 1856)
 Neurozerra flavicera (Hua, Chou, Fang et Chen, 1990)
 Neurozerra roricyanea (Walker, 1862)

References

Natural History Museum Lepidoptera generic names catalog

Zeuzerinae